George Crawford Harrison (27 June 1860 – 16 March 1900) was an English first-class cricketer and educator.

Life
The son of William Harrison, he was born at Maida Hill in June 1860. He was educated firstly at Malvern College, leaving in 1874 for Clifton College. From Clifton he went up to Oriel College, Oxford in 1879.

After graduating from Oxford, Harrison became an assistant master at Clifton in 1883, before holding the same position at Fettes College in Edinburgh from 1890 until his death there in March 1900 from pleuropneumonia following influenza.

Cricket
While a student at Oxford, Harrison played first-class cricket for Oxford University, making his debut against the Marylebone Cricket Club at Oxford in 1880. He played first-class cricket for Oxford until 1883, making a total of eighteen appearances. Primarily a slow bowler who was described by Wisden Cricketers' Almanack as “a good slow bowler, twisting the ball both ways”, he took a total of 64 wickets for Oxford at an average of 19.21. Harrison took a five wicket haul on four occasions, with best figures of 7 for 69. Wisden commented that in later matches he “developed an extraordinary twist from leg”, alluding to him becoming a leg spin bowler. He was less successful with the bat, scoring 237 runs with a high score of 28.

Family
Harrison married in 1887 Selina Margaret Atlay, daughter of James Atlay.

References

External links

1860 births
1900 deaths
People from Maida Vale
People educated at Malvern College
People educated at Clifton College
Alumni of Oriel College, Oxford
English cricketers
Oxford University cricketers
Schoolteachers from Bristol
Deaths from pneumonia in Scotland
Deaths from influenza
Schoolteachers from Edinburgh